Madeline is a book series, part of the Madeline media franchise, originally created by Ludwig Bemelmans. The series follows the daily adventures of Madeline, a seven-year-old girl attending a boarding school in Paris with eleven other girls, under the care of their teacher, Miss Clavel.

The first book was published in 1939, and proved to be a success, so Bemelmans wrote many sequels in the 1940s and 1950s. The series continued, written by Bemelmans' grandson John Bemelmans Marciano.  As of 1998, the series had sold over 15 million copies worldwide.

Series summary
Each book in the series begins with the rhyme:
 

Madeline is the smallest yet bravest of the twelve girls at the boarding school. She is only 7 years old and is the only redhead in the school. She has many adventures while there, including falling off a bridge and being saved by a stray dog, and meeting Pepito, the mischievous boy next door.

Books
The original series by Ludwig Bemelmans consists of six books: 
 Madeline (1939) - Madeline gets appendicitis and must go to a hospital to have her appendix removed.
 Madeline's Rescue (1953) - Madeline falls off a bridge and is rescued by a stray dog, who joins her school. Winner of the 1954 Caldecott Medal.
 Madeline and the Bad Hat (1956) - The Spanish Ambassador moves in next door, and Madeline instinctively realizes that his son Pepito is mean and spoiled.
 Madeline's Christmas (1956) - Madeline celebrates Christmas with her friends.
 Madeline and the Gypsies (1959) - Madeline and Pepito run away to join a group of traveling gypsies.
 Madeline in London (1961) - Madeline visits Pepito, who moved to London.

The first five in the series were recorded as audio-books narrated by Carol Channing, originally released on LP by Caedmon Records and later released on audio-cassette:
 Madeline and Other Bemelmans Told by Carol Channing [TC 1113], including Madeline, Madeline's Rescue and Madeline and the Bad Hat
 Madeline and the Gypsies [TC 1304]), including Madeline and the Gypsies and Madeline in London
   
The new series by John Bemelmans-Marciano consists of the following books:
 Madeline in America and Other Holiday Tales - Madeline travels to Texas.
 Madeline Loves Animals - Madeline travels to the zoo and meets the animals.
 Madeline Says Merci - Madeline learns how to be polite.
 Madeline and the Cats of Rome - Madeline and her class travel to Rome in spring.
 Madeline at the White House - Madeline and her class visit the White House in Washington, DC.
 Madeline and the Old House in Paris - Madeline and Pepito encounter a ghost in the old house in Paris.

Characters
 Madeline Fogg: The smallest of the girls and the title character. She is from 7 years old to 8 years old, and she is the only redhead in her class. She had her appendix removed in the first story. She is known for being the bravest and most outgoing of the girls. Contrary to popular belief, and to her depiction in the animated series and in the live-action film, she, and by extension, her classmates, weren't orphans in the original books, and were attending a Catholic boarding school. This is further reinforced in the first book wherein she received a dollhouse from her father (whose surname is revealed to be Fogg in Madeline in America and Other Holiday Tales).Voiced by Andrea Libman.
 Miss Clavel: Madeline's teacher and minder. She is commonly believed to be a Catholic nun because of her general appearance, but her attire in Bemelmans' illustrations is actually that of a nurse. The fact that she is not a nun is also evidenced by the fact that she is not called "Sister" or "Mother". She is always trying to keep Madeline out of trouble. Voiced by Stevie Vallance.
 Pepito: The Spanish Ambassador's son, who is about Madeline's age; he lives next door to the girls. For a time, he was constantly bullying the girls and being cruel to animals, but he changed his ways after one of his cruel tricks backfired. Due to his bratty nature and the distinctive hat that he constantly wore, he was called "the Bad Hat" by the girls. He stopped wearing the hat after he befriended the girls. Voiced by David Morse.
 Lord Cucuface: Chairman of the school's board of trustees. He initially ordered the removal of the dog Genevieve, but had a change of heart after receiving one of her puppies. He is known as "Lord Covington" in the live action movie. Voiced by French Tickner.
 Genevieve: The girls' anthropomorphic dog. She is extremely intelligent, possessing skills such as juggling and arithmetic, and is beloved by Madeline and her friends. She was a stray until she saved Madeline from drowning.
 Students at the school: The other girls who attend the boarding school with Madeline. All of the girls were initially nameless in the book series, while all were given names in the animated television series. The girls are close to one another and treat each other as family.
 Chloe: Long orange hair. Voiced by Tara Strong in the animated television series.
 Nicole: Short dirty blonde hair and light skin. Voiced by Veronika Sztopa in the animated television series.
 Danielle: Curly brown hair and light skin. Voiced by Chantal Strand in the animated television series.
 Yvette: Very short curly blonde hair. Voiced by Tabitha St. Germain in the animated television series.
 Nona: Long black hair and dark skin. Voiced by Kyla Pratt in the animated television series.
 Lulu: Short black hair and dark skin. Voiced by Erin Mathews in the animated television series.
 Anne: Long brown wavy hair and medium skin. Voiced by Kelly Sheridan in the animated television series.
 Ellie: Black short hair and dark skin. Voiced by Ashleigh Ball in the animated television series.
 Monique: Long brown hair in a flip and light skin. Voiced by Britt McKillip in the animated television series.
 Janine: Dark brown curly hair and dark skin. Voiced by Alyson Court in the animated television series.
 Sylvie: Long light brown hair and light skin. She is sometimes identified as Simone.
 Mrs. Murphy: The housekeeper, owner and maid of Madeline's boarding school.
 Sugar Dimples: A child movie star with famous blond curls. She is the girls' friend and loves Madeline. She is a parody of Shirley Temple.
 Giselle: Walks with a crutch and cries and gets upset when she loses and misses her only friend, Madeline. At first she thought Madeline was a doll, but she was glad Madeline was not a doll when the girls were leaving. Madeline takes Giselle home to spend the night. Giselle's mother, Yvette, bought her a new doll just to cheer her up, but Giselle was missing Madeline. The next day Madeline and the girls arrive at Giselle's house and have fun with her. They eat, play, and listen to stories with her.
 Paquito, Pablito and Panchito are Pepito's three cousins, they are very naughty and even worse than Pepito used to be. Due to their constant bullying of the girls and being cruel to animals, they are called the "Mean, nasty horrible hats" by the girls.
 Harry Houndai: A magician that Pepito admired after seeing his show what involved a water trick. Houndai came to watch Pepito do magic after Pepito did the water trick by jumping into the fountain in his garden. Houndai rescues him and tells that he must practice to be a magician and makes Pepito a member of The Society of Young Magicians.

Sales
At the time of the 1998 film adaptation's release, the series has sold over 15 million copies worldwide making it one of the best-selling book series of all-time.

See also

References

External links 
 Official website

Series of children's books